Floyd 'Payne' Turnham (January 23, 1909 – May 5, 1991) was an American R&B saxophonist in the 1950s, fronting the Floyd Turnham Combo.

Turnham was born in Washington state in 1909. He originally played alto saxophone with the Les Hite and Lionel Hampton bands. After a job offer from bandleader Joe Liggins, Turnham switched to baritone saxophone in 1950.

In 1952, Turnham signed with Jake Porter's Combo Records in Los Angeles, where he recorded the first of six singles. Three featured vocals by Cledus Harrison, notably "No Parking After Eight"; and two had vocals by Raymond Odoms: "Heavy Dreams" and "Alibi Baby". Turnham also recorded for Combo the Louis Jordon-esque instrumental "Turnham's Greens", and a final instrumental, "Rocket Ride". He also recorded for the Aladdin and Aries labels before moving to Fort Worth, Texas. He died in 1991.

References
ACE records sleeve notes from 'Cool Daddy' Central Avenue 1951–1957

1909 births
Musicians from Washington (state)
1991 deaths
American male saxophonists
20th-century American saxophonists
20th-century American male musicians
Southland Records artists